Adams Crossroads is an settlement  southeast of Hickman in Sussex County, Delaware, United States. Adams Crossroads is located at the intersection of Delaware Route 404 and Adamsville Road, northwest of Bridgeville in the Northwest Fork Hundred.

See also
Adamsville, Delaware
Adams Home Farm

References

Unincorporated communities in Sussex County, Delaware
Unincorporated communities in Delaware